Daniel Matthews or Dan Matthews may refer to:

 Daniel P. Matthews (1931–1953), United States Marine Corps sergeant and Medal of Honor recipient
 Daniel B. Matthews (born 1954), American financier and aviation/aerospace expert
 Dan Mathews (born  1964), senior vice president of People for the Ethical Treatment of Animals
 Daniel Matthews, missionary who founded Maloga Mission, New South Wales, Australia in 1874
 Daniel Matthews, winner of the 2018 British Sports Journalism Awards winners for Young Sports Writer

See also
 Daniel Mathews (disambiguation)
 Don Matthews
 Matthew Daniels